Petr Kumstát (born November 19, 1981) is a Czech professional ice hockey player. He played with HC Karlovy Vary in the Czech Extraliga during the 2010–11 Czech Extraliga season.

References

External links 
 
 

1981 births
Czech ice hockey forwards
HC Karlovy Vary players
Living people
HC Sparta Praha players
Sportspeople from Prostějov
SK Horácká Slavia Třebíč players
Orli Znojmo players